The 1921 Idaho Vandals football team represented the University of Idaho in the 1921 college football season. Idaho was led by second-year head coach Thomas Kelley in their last season as an independent before joining the Pacific Coast Conference. The Vandals had two home games in Moscow, one on campus at MacLean Field and another at the fairgrounds; they also played one in Boise at Public School Field.

Idaho dropped a seventh consecutive game to Washington State in the Battle of the Palouse, falling  at Rogers Field  Two years later, the Vandals won the first of three consecutive, their only three-peat in the rivalry series.

The Boise game against Wyoming on the third anniversary of Armistice Day was attended by Governor 

The following June, Kelley left for the University of Missouri. and was succeeded at Idaho in 1922 by Robert "Matty" Mathews.

Schedule

 The Little Brown Stein trophy for the Montana game debuted seventeen years later in 1938
 Two games were played on Friday (at Washington State in Pullman and against Wyoming in Boise)and one was played on Thursday (in Walla Walla against Whitman on Thanksgiving)

References

External links
Gem of the Mountains: 1923 University of Idaho yearbook (spring 1922) – 1921 football season
Go Mighty Vandals – 1921 football season
Official game program: Idaho at Washington State –  October 21, 1921
Idaho Argonaut – student newspaper – 1921 editions

Idaho
Idaho Vandals football seasons
Idaho Vandals football